Fox:Next was a television channel operated by Fox International Channels in Portugal. Its programming was focused on television series and movies. The channel was launched in Portugal on April 14, 2008, as part of the meo package line-up. It was also available on ZON TVCabo, Cabovisão, Vodafone Casa TV and Optimus Clix TV.

On July 1, 2011, coinciding with the first broadcasts of the Fox SD channels in widescreen, the channel was replaced by Fox Movies.

Programming 
 30 Rock
 Battlestar Galactica
 Easy Money
 Everybody Hates Chris
 Hung
 In Treatment
 Mad Men
 My Wife and Kids
 Pushing Daisies
 Saving Grace
 Six Feet Under
 Smallville
 Terminator: The Sarah Connor Chronicles

Fox Broadcasting Company
Portuguese-language television stations
Television channels and stations established in 2008
Television channels and stations disestablished in 2011
The Walt Disney Company subsidiaries